Cois na hAbhna is a concert and events venue in Ireland, located in the town of Ennis, County Clare. It is the regional base of Comhaltas Ceoiltóirí Éireann for the Meitheal region, the primary Irish organisation dedicated to the promotion of the music, song, dance and the language of Ireland.

The venue is used for a range of events including Irish Traditional music sessions, céilí dances drama performances and other concerts. Irish dancing lessons including set dancing are also carried out at the venue.

References

External links
Official Site

Ennis
Music venues in the Republic of Ireland
Tourist attractions in County Clare